Arthur Mann was an English professional rugby league footballer who played in the 1900s, 1910s and 1920s. He played at representative level for Great Britain and England, and at club level for Bradford Northern (two spells), and Hull Kingston Rovers, as a forward (prior to the specialist positions of), during the era of contested scrums.

International honours
Arthur Mann won caps for England while at Bradford Northern in 1908 against Wales, in 1909 against Australia (3 matches), and won caps for Great Britain while at Bradford Northern in 1908-09 against Australia (2 matches), becoming Bradford Northern's first Test match player.

Note
The englandrl.co.uk and rugbyleagueproject.org websites state Mann's forename as being Arthur, whereas rlhp.co.uk states it as being Alf.

References

External links
Photograph "Alf Mann - Alf Mann was Bradford Northern's first Test player, playing against Australia in 1908/09. He was transferred to Hull KR in 1909 but returned to play for Bradford Northern from 1918 until 1922. - Date: 01/01/1918" at rlhp.co.uk

Bradford Bulls players
England national rugby league team players
English rugby league players
Great Britain national rugby league team players
Hull Kingston Rovers players
Place of birth missing
Place of death missing
Rugby league forwards
Year of birth missing
Year of death missing